The Mindoro–Batangas Super Bridge is a proposed  pontoon bridge which is planned to connect the Philippine province of Batangas and Mindoro island.

History
Proposals to construct a bridge to connect Batangas and Mindoro island has been made as early as 2011. The bridge is meant to facilitate easier transport of agricultural goods from Mindoro island to Metro Manila which are usually exported from the island using inter-island vessels. In early 2011, Oriental Mindoro Governor Alfonso Umali Jr. has coordinated with President Benigno Aquino III regarding the conducting a study to construct a bridge in the area. Aquino has delegated Department of Public Works and Highways (DPWH) secretary, Rogelio Singson to start conducting a feasibility study on the bridge within 2011. On December 22, 2011, Umali met with principal Chinese investors in Calapan regarding plans to construct such a bridge. Chinese engineers also conducted a site survey in the area. The bridge is planned to span across the Isla Verde Passage and will cross Verde Island.

The DPWH announced in January 2012 that construction of the bridge will commence in February 2012, Although construction of the bridge did not commence as announced.

2015 developments

San Miguel Corporation first expressed interest to construct the bridge in 2013. In early 2015, a group of Malaysian investors led by Mohammed Jamil expressed interest in the project and is eyeing to import rice from Oriental Mindoro. A floating bridge or pontoon bridge design was adopted to avoid damaging the seabed of the Isla Verde Passage which is considered a "center of biodiversity".

San Miguel Corporation presented a plan for the bridge was presented to Governor Vilma Santos of Batangas and Governor Alfonso Umali Jr. of Oriental Mindoro. The cost of the construction of the  bridge is ₱18 billion and will take five years to build.

The bridge is planned to span the Isla Verde Passage. The bridge compose of two components. The first will span 6.4 kilometers (4.0 mi) from Barangay Ilijan in Batangas City to Verde Island. The second component spanning 4.4 kilometers (2.7 mi) will continue from Verde Island to Barangay Sinandigan in Puerto Galera, Oriental Mindoro.

The Batangas-Mindoro bridge is touted to be the first floating bridge in Asia with high ship passage on its pontoons. The bridge will have pedestrian and bicycle lanes.

References

Proposed bridges in the Philippines
Buildings and structures in Batangas
Buildings and structures in Oriental Mindoro
Transportation in Batangas
Mindoro